Transit may refer to:

Arts and entertainment

Film
 Transit (1979 film), a 1979 Israeli film
 Transit (2005 film), a film produced by MTV and Staying-Alive about four people in countries in the world
 Transit (2006 film), a 2006 film about Russian and American pilots in World War II
 Transit (2012 film),  an American thriller
 Transit (2013 film), a Filipino independent film
 Transit (2018 film), a German film

Literature
 Transit (Cooper novel), a 1964 science fiction by Edmund Cooper
 Transit (Seghers novel), a 1944 novel by Anna Seghers 
 Transit (Aaronovitch novel), a 1992 novel by Ben Aaronovitch based on the TV series Doctor Who

Music
 Transit (band), an American emo band from Boston, Massachusetts
 Transit (Ira Stein and Russel Walder album), an album by acoustic duo Ira Stein and Russel Walder, released 1986
 Transit (Sponge Cola album)
 Transit (A. J. Croce album)
 Transit Transit, an album by the band Autolux
 Transit (rapper), real name Dan Bennett, Canadian indie hip-hop artist

Science and technology

Computing
 Internet transit, one of two mechanisms by which Internet traffic is exchanged between internet service providers

Astronomy, navigation, and surveying
 Transit (astronomy), the apparent motion of one celestial body across the face of another celestial body or meridian
 Transit telescope, a special-purpose telescope mounted so as to point only at objects transiting the local meridian
 A specialized type of theodolite used in surveying
 Transit (satellite), the first satellite navigation system to be used operationally
 Navigational transit, when a navigator observes two fixed reference points in line

Transportation
Transit (app), a mobile application for public transportation trip planning
Transit bus, a type of bus used on shorter-distance public transport bus services
 Public transport systems, sometimes called 'mass transit', 'public transit', or simply 'transit', in which passengers are carried in large numbers using shared vehicles.
 Ford Transit, a Ford Motor Company van
 Transit (ship), the name given to the three sailing vessels designed and built for Captain Richard Hall Gower
TransIT, a bus service in Frederick County, Maryland

Other uses
 Transit, Canadian shoe retailer now operating under the name Spring
Transit hotel

See also
 Transat (disambiguation)
 Transition (disambiguation)
 Sic transit gloria mundi
Transport or transportation